Frederick M. Zollo (born 24 February 1953) is an American producer and director of both film and theatre.

Selected theatrical productions
 Once
 On Golden Pond
 The Farnsworth Invention
 Frozen
 The Goat: or, Who is Sylvia?
 Sex, Drugs, Rock & Roll
 King Hedley II
 Buried Child
 Our Country's Good
 Hurlyburly
 Butley
 Pounding Nails in the Floor with My Forehead
 Caroline, or Change
 Private Lives
 Death and the Maiden
 Chitty Chitty Bang Bang
 Glengarry Glen Ross
 Les Liaisons Dangereuses
 The Basic Training of Pavlo Hummel
 Ma Rainey's Black Bottom
 'night, Mother
 Angels in America
 A Steady Rain

Select filmography
He was a producer in all films unless otherwise noted.

Film

Miscellaneous crew

As an actor

Television

References

External links
 
 

1953 births
Living people
Film producers from Massachusetts
American people of Italian descent
Male actors from Boston